Heigo is a masculine given name.

People named Heigo include:
Heigo Hamaguchi (born 1974), Japanese professional wrestler
Heigo Fuchino (1888-1961), architect from Hawaii

Masculine given names